Trysimia propinqua is a species of beetle in the family Cerambycidae. It was described by Stephan von Breuning in 1959. It is known from Moluccas.

References

Lamiini
Beetles described in 1959